The 2017 MTN 8 was the 43rd edition of South Africa's annual soccer cup competition, the MTN 8. It featured the top eight teams of the Premier Soccer League at the end of the 2016-17 season.

Teams
The eight teams that competed in the MTN 8 knockout competition are (listed according to their finishing position in the 2016/2017 Premier Soccer League Season):
 1. Bidvest Wits
 2. Mamelodi Sundowns
 3. Cape Town City
 4. Kaizer Chiefs
 5. SuperSport United
 6. Polokwane City
 7. Maritzburg United
 8. Golden Arrows

Results

Quarter-finals

Semi-finals

1st Leg

2nd Leg

Final

References

MTN 8
2017–18 in South African soccer
2017 domestic association football cups